Carmichaelia torulosa is a species of plant in the family Fabaceae. It is found only in New Zealand.

Conservation status
The IUCN redlist lists it as "near threatened", with the major threat being habitat loss. The New Zealand Threat Classification System (NZTCS) listed it as "Threatened - Nationally Endangered" in 2013, and in 2017 as "Threatened - Nationally Critical".

References

torulosa
Flora of New Zealand
Near threatened plants
Taxonomy articles created by Polbot